Nisotra is a genus of flea beetles in the family Chrysomelidae. They are found in Africa, Asia, and Australia. There are around 90 described species in Nisotra, including about 70 in Sub-Saharan Africa and Madagascar. Many of these species are agricultural pests.

Description 
Nisotra can be recognised by: a thickset and distinctly convex body; the pronotum as wide of the elytra basally; the pronotum anterior margin with two longitudinal groove-like impressions, often deeply impressed and sometimes reaching middle of pronotum.

Diet 
Nisotra feed on plants in the families Malvaceae, Bombacaceae, Tiliaceae, Fabaceae, Rosaceae, Asteraceae, Lamiaceae, Rubiaceae, Poaceae and Orchidaceae.

Larvae feed on roots (boring in stems has also been reported), while adults feed on leaves.

Pests 
In the Solomon Islands, N. basselae is a pest on bele (Abelmoschus manihot). Its impact is so severe that bele is no longer grown in many places on the islands.

Nisotra chrysomeloides is a pest on okra (Abelmoschus esculentus). Its abundance varies depending on temperature, relative humidity and rainfall. Another okra pest is Nisotra sjostedti.

Species
These species, among others, belong to the genus Nisotra:

 Nisotra apicalis Jacoby 1899
 Nisotra aruwimiana Weise
 Nisotra basselae (Bryant)
 Nisotra bicolorata Csiki, 1940
 Nisotra breweri Baly, 1877
 Nisotra brunnea Jacoby 1894
 Nisotra ceylonensis Jacoby 1899
 Nisotra chapuisi Jacoby 1876
 Nisotra chrysomeloides Jacoby 1885
 Nisotra dilecta (Dalman, 1823)
 Nisotra dohertyi Maulik, 1926
 Nisotra fulva (Medvedev, 2018)
 Nisotra gemella (Erichson, 1834)
 Nisotra goudoti Harold, 1875
 Nisotra insulana Medvedev, 2008
 Nisotra javana Motschulsky, 1866
 Nisotra javanica
 Nisotra klugii Jacoby 1892
 Nisotra lineella Weise, 1916
 Nisotra madagascariensis Jacoby 1901
 Nisotra madurensis Jacoby, 1896
 Nisotra malayana Medvedev, 2016
 Nisotra mera Weise, 1916
 Nisotra nigripennis Jacoby 1903
 Nisotra nigripes Jacoby 1894
 Nisotra obliterata Jacoby
 Nisotra oneili Jacoby 1906
 Nisotra orbiculata Motschulsky, 1866
 Nisotra pallida Jacoby, 1898
 Nisotra semicoerulea Jacoby 1903
 Nisotra sjostedti Jacoby 1903
 Nisotra sordida Weise, 1916
 Nisotra spadicea (Dalman, 1823)
 Nisotra striatipennis Jacoby
 Nisotra submetallica Blackburn, 1894
 Nisotra terminata Jacoby 1894
 Nisotra theobromae Laboissiere, 1920
 Nisotra uniformis Jacoby 1906
 Nisotra xinjiangana Zhang & Yang, 2007

References

External links

 

Alticini
Chrysomelidae genera
Taxa named by Joseph Sugar Baly